Pasilan linkkitorni, also known as Yle Transmission Tower, is a  high TV tower in Pasila, Helsinki. Pasilan linkkitorni was built in 1983 and has at a height of  rooms with technical equipment. It is the tallest freestanding tower in the Greater Helsinki area and the second tallest in Finland, after Näsinneula in Tampere.

References

External links

 

Towers completed in 1983
Communication towers in Finland
Buildings and structures in Helsinki
Transmitter sites in Finland
Pasila
Yle
1983 establishments in Finland